The Nanda Devi Plutonium Mission was a joint operation by the United States Central Intelligence Agency (CIA) and the Indian Intelligence Bureau (IB) to spy on the nuclear developments being conducted in the Xinjiang Province of China. The agencies cooperated in October 1965 to install a nuclear-powered remote sensing station on the peak of Nanda Devi in the Uttarakhand Garhwal Himalayas.

The mission failed after the plutonium powered Radioisotope Thermoelectric Generator was lost in the mountains because of a strong snowstorm.

The mission

In 1965, the Pentagon and the CIA were worried about the Chinese Nuclear Developments. The Vietnam War was ramping up and the United States had no intelligence data to counter any Chinese threat. The Chinese conducted nuclear tests in secretive facilities.

Two years prior, a top US air force officer led a successful expedition to the summit of Mount Everest. He suggested Pentagon to recruit the hardy Sherpas to install a remote sensing station on the summit. But this idea ran into some problem as Mount Everest also bordered China.

In October 1965, the CIA with the Indian Intelligence Bureau started the mission. The members were tasked to install an 8–10 feet high antenna, two transceiver sets, and the plutonium-powered Radioisotope Thermoelectric Generator and its seven plutonium capsules. When the mission reached camp IV, a blizzard hit, and team leader Manmohan Singh Kohli decided to return back. The mission hooked the device in a crevice, anchored it, and headed back to the base.

Aftermath

In the spring of May 1966, a follow-up Indian expedition was sent to Camp IV to recover the device and its plutonium capsules. The expedition failed to find any signs of the generator and its capsules. Later, an American team of mountaineers was also recruited to recover the device. One of the members of the team, Dave Dingman, said that they had scanned the area of Nanda Devi with neutron detectors but no evidence of plutonium was found. The team concluded that the device and its capsules were carried downhill by a landslide.

In 1967, the CIA managed to install a nuclear-powered signal device near the summit of Nanda Kot, at over 22,000 feet; the device worked for a few months and confirmed that the Chinese did not, at that time, possess a long-range nuclear bomb.

Claims and beliefs
Broughton Coburn, author of the book The Vast Unknown: America's First Ascent of Everest, claims that the Indian intelligence had secretly hiked up there before that spring mission and retrieved the device, presumably in order to study it and possibly gather the plutonium.

The local inhabitants of the region claim that due to the presence of the nuclear capsule there has been an increased number of floods and ice calving.

References

 
 
Indian intelligence agencies
Sacred mountains
Mountains of Uttarakhand
Geography of Chamoli district
Highest points of Indian states and union territories
Seven-thousanders of the Himalayas
National symbols of India